Pulchérie Edith Gbalet is an Ivoirian scholar and activist. She led the "Orange Vests" movement, a protest group taking inspiration from the yellow vests movement, against the government of Ivory Coast. She has been involved in union organizing as well. During the 2020 protests against Alassane Ouattara, she was sent to jail for her activism. She is considered a political prisoner today.

References

21st-century Ivorian women
Ivorian people
Political prisoners
Ivorian democracy activists
Year of birth missing (living people)
Living people
Place of birth missing (living people)